Herbert Finlay was an Australian producer, photographer and exhibitor. He initially worked in films as a photographer and exhibitor of news items in Melbourne in the late 1890s. He helped tour The Story of the Kelly Gang (1907) and joined Pathe in 1910 to produce the Sydney edition of their newsreel. He went into producing with Stanley Crick and ran the camera department for the Australian Photo-Play Company. He was seriously injured in a film fire and became a travelling exhibitor.

He supported the existence of a film quota in Australia.

Selected Credits
Ben Hall and his Gang (1911) – producer, DOP
Frank Gardiner, the King of the Road (1911) – producer
The Assigned Servant (1911) – producer
Keane of Kalgoorlie (1911) – producer
The Life Story of John Lee, or The Man They Could Not Hang (1912) – producer
Trooper O'Brien (1928) – producer

References

Australian photographers
Year of birth missing
Year of death missing